Amita Aggarwal (born 1960) is an Indian clinical immunologist, rheumatologist and a Professor and Head at the Department of Clinical Immunology and Rheumatology of the Sanjay Gandhi Postgraduate Institute of Medical Sciences, Lucknow. Known for her studies in autoimmune rheumatic diseases, Aggarwal is a recipient of the Shakuntala Amir Chand Award of the Indian Council of Medical Research and an elected fellow of the National Academy of Sciences, India, National Academy of Medical Sciences and the National Academy of Medical Sciences. The Department of Biotechnology of the Government of India awarded her the National Bioscience Award for Career Development, one of the highest Indian science awards, for her contributions to biosciences in 2004.

Biography 

Amita Aggarwal, born in 1960, earned her medical degree of MBBS as well as a post-graduate degree (MD in Internal Medicine) from the All India Institute of Medical Sciences, Delhi and secured the degree of DM in Clinical Immunology from Sanjay Gandhi Postgraduate Institute of Medical Sciences (SGPGI). Her career started at SGPGI as a member of faculty in 1996 and she holds the position of a Professor and Head at the Department of Clinical Immunology and Rheumatology. In between, she received advanced training in Rheumatology at the Royal Melbourne Hospital in 1995 on an APLAR fellowship and at the University of Oklahoma Health Science Center on a research associateship from the Department of Biotechnology. In addition, she has trained at the Centers for Disease Control and Prevention, Atlanta, USA.

Legacy 

Aggarwal, who is known for her research in the field of autoimmune rheumatic diseases, especially the pathogenesis of Juvenile Idiopathic Arthritis (JIA). She described that the phenotype of JIA in Indian patients is different from that elsewhere, and that enthesitis-related arthritis (ERA) is the most common. She has contributed significantly to understanding the pathogenesis of ERA, such as the role of macrophages and T cells, various cytokines and gut microbiome.  Besides JIA, she has made seminal contributions in the area of nephritis in patients with systemic lupus erythematosus (SLE). She is currently coordinating a multi-institutional network project on SLE to understand the diversity of SLE across India.

She has contributed immensely to developing manpower for Rheumatology by training nearly 100 students who are now spread across India. She has been holding a National Workshop on Autoantibodies to train Indian physicians in the laboratory diagnostics of autoimmune disease. She heads the regional diagnostic centre of the Foundation for Primary Immunodeficiency Diseases (FPID), an international organization established to combat primary immunodeficiencies (PID). She is one of the resource persons for PID facilities in India. 
She has held the office of the President of the Indian Rheumatology Association. She was also the national coordinator for India of the Paediatric Rheumatology International Trials Organization.

Awards and honors 
Aggarwal received the Shakuntala Amir Chand Prize of the Indian Council of Medical Research in 1998, for her studies in auto-immune rheumatic diseases and the ICMR honored her again in 2001 with the Dr. Kamala Menon Award. The Department of Biotechnology of the Government of India awarded her the National Bioscience Award for Career Development, one of the highest Indian science awards in 2004. The award orations delivered by her include the Zydus Oration of the Indian Association of Rheumatology (2002), Dr. Coelho Memorial Lecturer (2005) of the Association of Physicians of India and the Kshanika Oration (2005) of ICMR. The National Academy of Sciences, India elected her as a fellow in 2013 and she received the elected fellowship of the National Academy of Medical Sciences in 2014.

Selected bibliography

See also 

 Systemic-onset juvenile idiopathic arthritis
 Genetic polymorphism

Notes

References

Further reading 
 

N-BIOS Prize recipients
Indian scientific authors
Living people
1960 births
Indian immunologists
Indian rheumatologists
Indian medical academics
Indian medical administrators
Fellows of The National Academy of Sciences, India
All India Institute of Medical Sciences, New Delhi alumni
Sanjay Gandhi Postgraduate Institute of Medical Sciences alumni
University of Oklahoma alumni
Fellows of the National Academy of Medical Sciences
Women academic administrators
Women scientists from Uttar Pradesh
Scientists from Lucknow
Scholars from Uttar Pradesh
20th-century Indian medical doctors
21st-century Indian medical doctors
Indian women medical doctors
20th-century Indian women scientists
21st-century Indian women scientists
Medical doctors from Uttar Pradesh
20th-century women physicians
21st-century women physicians
Women rheumatologists